Kyle GAA is a Gaelic Athletic Association hurling club in County Laois, Ireland.

Located near Ballaghmore on the County Laois-County Tipperary border, the club colours are blue and white.

History

Kyle won its only Laois Senior Hurling Championship title in 1951.

They were in the 1994 Laois Junior Hurling Championship Final.

After a memorable 2006 campaign, Kyle won the Laois Junior Hurling Championship beating neighbours Camross in the final to end a long spell without a championship title.

Achievements
 Laois Senior Hurling Championship: (1) 1951
 Laois Junior Hurling Championship: (3) 1977, 2006, 2009
 Laois Junior B Hurling Championship: (2) 1993, 2018

Notable players

 Kieran Carey

References

Gaelic games clubs in County Laois
Hurling clubs in County Laois